Derbyshire County Cricket Club in 1895 was the first season in which the English county cricket club Derbyshire played in the County Championship which had been established in 1890. The club settled their place by coming fifth with five championship wins. It was the club's 25th season although the matches in the period between 1888 and 1893 were not given first-class status. Matches in 1894 were accorded first class status, but were not included in the County Championship.

1895 season

Derbyshire joined the County Championship, together with Essex, Leicestershire, Warwickshire and Hampshire. 
Derbyshire played 16 games in the County Championship, and one match against MCC. They won six matches altogether and drew seven. Brewer's son Sydney Evershed was in his fifth season as captain. William Chatterton was top scorer although George Davidson had a better average and took most wickets with 93 (79 in the championship).

Making their entry in the Championship, the club tried out a large number of players, all of whom played less than 20 games for the club. John Berwick lasted longest as a regular player, while John Hall and Henry Blackwell appeared infrequently over several seasons. John Goodall, John Bennett and Joseph Brooks played in 1895 and in 1896, while Harry Storer and Thomas Richardson only played in the 1895 season. Jesse Boot and Harry Spencer played only one match.

Matches

{| class="wikitable" width="100%"
! bgcolor="#efefef" colspan=6 | List of matches
|- bgcolor="#efefef"
!No.
!Date
!V
!Result 
!Margin
!Notes
|-
|1
|13 May 1895
|WarwickshireAt Edgbaston
|bgcolor="#FFCC00"|Drawn
|
|AFA Lilley 139; HW Bainbridge 104HJ Pallett 8–69

|-
|2
|20 May 1895
|MCCAt Lord's
|bgcolor="#00FF00"|Won
|42 runs
| F Martin 6–22; W Mead 6–90
|-
|3
|3 Jun 1895
|HampshireAt County Ground, Southampton
|bgcolor="#FF0000"|Lost
|Innings and 79 runs
|T Soar 7–49; H Baldwin 5–61
|-
|4
|10 Jun 1895
|WarwickshireAt County Ground, Derby
|bgcolor="#00FF00"|Won
|201 runs
| GA Davidson 9–39
|-
|5
|20 Jun 1895
|YorkshireAt Headingley
|bgcolor="#00FF00"|Won
|107 runs
|
|-
|6
|24 Jun 1895
|LeicestershireAt County Ground, Derby
|bgcolor="#FFCC00"|Drawn
|
| W Chatterton 127; G Porter 5–67
|-
|7
|1 Jul 1895 
|NottinghamshireAt County Ground, Derby
|bgcolor="#FFCC00"|Drawn
|
| GA Davidson 6–45; W Flowers 7–69; JW Bennett 5–40
|-
|8
|8 Jul 1895
|YorkshireAt County Ground, Derby
|bgcolor="#FF0000"|Lost
|171 runs
| H Bagshaw 127*; S Evershed 112S Haigh 5–73; JW Bennett 5–101; FW Milligan 6–26
|-
|9
|11 Jul 1895
|NottinghamshireAt Trent Bridge
|bgcolor="#FFCC00"|Drawn
|
| A Shrewsbury 143;
|-
|10
|15 Jul 1895
|Essex At County Ground, Leyton
|bgcolor="#FF0000"|Lost
|134 runs
| GA Davidson 5–43; CJ Kortright 7–50 & 6–53; G Porter 5–80
|-
|11
 |18 Jul 1895
|SurreyAt Kennington Oval
|bgcolor="#FFCC00"|Drawn
|
| T Richardson 6–100; GA Davidson 5–72
|-
|12
 |29 Jul 1895
|SurreyAt County Ground, Derby
|bgcolor="#FF0000"|Lost
|Innings and 53 runs
| T Richardson 5–27 & 6–33; George Porter 5–67
|-
|13
 |1 Aug 1895
|LancashireAt Old Trafford, Manchester
|bgcolor="#FFCC00"|Drawn
|
| GA Davidson 6–67
|-
|14
|5 Aug 1895
|HampshireAt County Ground, Derby
|bgcolor="#00FF00"|Won
|Innings and 50 runs
| G Porter 7–52 & 7–49; H Baldwin 5–76
|-

|15
|8 Aug 1895
|LeicestershireAt Grace Road, Leicestershire
|bgcolor="#00FF00"|Won
|127 runs
| W Sugg 104* F Wright 5–78; GG Walker 9–68; F Geeson 5–94
|-
|16
 |19 Aug 1895
|LancashireAt County Ground, Derby
|bgcolor="#00FF00"|Won
|63 runs
| W Storer 108 AW Mold 7–57; GA Davidson 8–25; G Porter 5–55 
|-
|17
 |26 Aug 1895
|EssexAt County Ground, Derby
|bgcolor="#FFCC00"|Drawn
|
| H Bagshaw 99; JW Bennett 5–8; 
|-

Statistics

County Championship batting averages

Additionally Henry Blackwell played in the non County Championship match against MCC making a total of 2 runs.

County Championship bowling averages

Wicket Keeping

See also
Derbyshire County Cricket Club seasons
1895 English cricket season

References

1895 in English cricket
Derbyshire County Cricket Club seasons
English cricket seasons in the 19th century